Parthamasiris, also known as Partamasir or Parthomasiris (flourished second half of the 1st century and first half of the 2nd century, died 114) was a Parthian Prince who served as a Roman Client King of Armenia.

Parthamasiris was one of the three sons born to the King Pacorus II of Parthia by an unnamed mother. Through his father he was a member of the House of Parthia thus a relation of the Arsacid dynasty of Armenia. Little is known of his life prior to becoming Armenian King.

In 113, Parthamasiris’ paternal uncle Osroes I of Parthia deposed his brother Axidares from the Armenian Kingship and installed him as the Armenian King to avoid to going to war with the Roman emperor Trajan and keep peace with him. Axidares was placed on the Armenian throne by his paternal uncle without Roman consultation which led to Trajan to view the action by Osroes I as an invitation to war with Parthia.

When Trajan with his army had advanced to Parthia, the Roman emperor received Parthamasiris. Parthamasiris hoped he could retain his Armenian Kingship, however was rejected after Trajan had listened to him and declined his request to keep his Kingship. After rejecting Parthamasiris’ request, Trajan annexed Armenia as a Roman Province.

Trajan sent Parthamasiris from Armenia back home to Parthia and Trajan continued on with his Parthian military campaign. On his way home to Parthia, Parthamasiris disappeared; historian Ehsan Yarshater has speculated that Trajan may have ordered Parthamasiris's murder.

References

Sources
 M. Bunson, A Dictionary of the Roman Empire, Oxford University Press, 1995
 K. Farrokh, Shadows in the Desert: Ancient Persia at War, Osprey Publishing, 2007
 T. Mommsen, W. Purdie Dickson & F. Haverfield, The provinces of the Roman Empire: from Caesar to Domitian, Gorgias Press LLC, 2004
 D.T. Potts, Araby the Blest: Studies in Arabian Archaeology, Museum Tusculanum Press, 1988
 Yarshater, The Cambridge History of Iran, Volume 3, Cambridge University Press, 1993

2nd-century kings of Armenia
Arsacid kings of Armenia
Roman client kings of Armenia
2nd-century Iranian people
114 deaths
Year of birth unknown